Big Cove Tannery is an unincorporated community in Fulton County, Pennsylvania, United States.

In 2017, the Pennsylvania Fish and Boat Commission announced that a part of Big Cove Creek near Big Cove Tannery in Fulton County, had been selected as one of 14 Keystone Select Stocked Trout Waters to be stocked with 14- to 20-inch trout.

References

Unincorporated communities in Fulton County, Pennsylvania
Unincorporated communities in Pennsylvania